The 1951 Tennessee Volunteers baseball team represented the University of Tennessee Volunteers in the 1951 NCAA baseball season. The Volunteers played their home games at Lower Hudson Field. The team was coached by S. W. Anderson in his 4th season at Tennessee.

The Volunteers finished second in the College World Series, defeated by the Oklahoma Sooners in the championship game.

Roster

Schedule and results

Schedule Source:

Awards and honors 
Sidney Hatfield 
College World Series Most Outstanding Player

Herky Payne
American Baseball Coaches Association Second Team All-American

Bert Rechichar
All-Southeastern Conference

Andy Anderson
All-Southeastern Conference

John Huffstetler
All-Southeastern Conference

References

Tennessee Volunteers baseball seasons
Tennessee Volunteers baseball
College World Series seasons
Southeastern Conference baseball champion seasons
1951 Southeastern Conference baseball season